Pärnu Linnameeskond or simply Pärnu, was a football club, based in Pärnu, Estonia. Founded in 2010 as the union of Vaprus, Pärnu JK and Pärnu Kalev. Pärnu Linnameeskond finished 2014 Esiliiga season in third place and was promoted to Meistriliiga. Linnameeskond broke up after second season in the top tier with Vaprus inheriting their league spot for 2017.

Honours
 Esiliiga
 Third place (1): 2014

 Esiliiga B
 Runners-up (1): 2013

Managerial history

Statistics

Pärnu Linnameeskond

League and Cup

References

External links
Official website

Defunct football clubs in Estonia
Meistriliiga clubs
Sport in Pärnu
Association football clubs established in 2011
2011 establishments in Estonia
2017 disestablishments in Estonia